Barracora is a 1981 pinball machine released by Williams Electronics. It was based on the Williams System 7 design which debuted with the Black Knight game.

Barracora'''s backglass art was inspired by the famous artist H. R. Giger's 1974 painting Li I. Giger is known for his design in the science fiction horror movie Alien (1979) directed by Ridley Scott.

Among the games elements are two banks of drop targets, including a three-target set (B, A, and RR) and a five-target set (A, C, O, R, A).

Origin of the name
The most common story of Barracora'''s strange name is that original plans to name the game "Barracuda" (in keeping with its semi-aquatic artwork) were blocked at the last minute by trademark concerns. Williams elected to avoid potential legal issues by renaming the game. With such short notice, only a relatively minor change could be made to the design and artwork without severely impacting the schedule. However, according to pinball designer Larry Demar: "The original name of the game was 'Las Vegas', eventually becoming 'Jet Orbit', then eventually becoming 'Barracora'. Going from eight letters in the original names to nine letters in 'Barracora' forced two 'R's to be placed on the left bank of drop targets."

References

External links
IPDB Listing for Williams Barracora

Williams pinball machines
1981 pinball machines